The Saint Germain Movement is a religious organization, headquartered in Schaumburg, Illinois, a suburb of Chicago, with a major facility just north of Dunsmuir, California, in the buildings and property of the Shasta Springs retreat. There is also a facility in the Capitol Hill neighborhood in downtown Denver, Colorado.

The doctrines of the organization are based on teachings and wisdom received by Guy Ballard in 1930.  Ballard was hiking on the slopes of Mount Shasta in California, and claimed Saint Germain appeared to him and began training him to be a "Messenger".  Ballard published his experiences in a series of books.  The organization's philosophies are known as the "I AM" Activity, and its members popularly known as "I AM" Students.

There are hundreds of "I AM" Temples and Sanctuaries located in most principal cities of the United States, Canada, Western Europe, Australia and locations in India, Latin America and Africa, where members come together every week to decree for the benefit of mankind. There are also Group Meetings on various continents, as well as Introductory Classes and Musicals. https://www.saintgermainfoundation.org/our-activities    The Saint Germain Foundation and Press today serves "I AM" Students all over the world and performs Pageants for residents and visitors alike in Mt. Shasta: "For more than 70 years, the 'I AM' COME! Pageant, on the Life of Jesus the Christ, has been given annually in the outdoor G. W. Ballard Amphitheater, with magnificent Mt. Shasta (California) as a backdrop." The next performance will be in August 2023. There are also "I AM" Musicals that are free for listening over the web at https://www.saintgermainfoundation.org/musicalbroadcasts. 

J. Gordon Melton, who never was a student or participated in Saint Germain Foundation activities; however, said he studied the group and ranked it in the category "established cult". Also present in New Zealand, the St. Germain Foundation is considered by writer Robert S. Ellwood as a religious group with theosophical and esoteric roots. It is recognized by the Theosophical Society and the Great White Brotherhood.

The group was labelled as cult in the 1995 report established by Parliamentary Commission on Cults in France. The group founded a community in France in 1956 and is now located in the Alpes-de-Haute-Provence. It counts less than 50 members. In 1997, the Belgian parliamentary commission established a list of 189 movements containing I AM.

Worldwide, the religious group had over one million members in 1940, but it began to decline after Ballard's death. Among the splinter groups of the Saint Germain Foundation, there have been The Bridge to Freedom, The Summit Lighthouse and the Church Universal and Triumphant.

See also
Edna Anne Wheeler Ballard - co-founder

References

External links

 Home Page of the Saint Germain Foundation
 Publications of the FBI Case  BALLARD, EDNA ANNE processed and released pursuant to the Freedom of Information Act (FOIA), a Document with all published pages of this case.
 Release 1 of the Publications of the FBI Case BALLARD, GUY WARREN processed and released pursuant to the Freedom of Information Act (FOIA), a Document with all published pages of this case.
 Release 2 of the Publications of the FBI Case BALLARD, GUY WARREN processed and released pursuant to the Freedom of Information Act (FOIA), a Document with all published pages of this case.

Ascended Master Teachings
Cults
Schaumburg, Illinois
New religious movements